CyberSplash Entertainment is an American-French production company that operates as a joint-venture between Cyber Group Studios and Splash Entertainment.

References

Animation studios
Mass media companies established in 2022